Felice Milano (23 May 1891 – 11 November 1915) was an Italian footballer who played as a forward. He represented the Italy national football team five times, the first being on 17 March 1912, the occasion of a friendly match against France in a 4–3 home loss. He was also part of Italy's squad for the football tournament at the 1912 Summer Olympics, but he did not play in any matches.

Honours

Player
Pro Vercelli
Italian Football Championship: 1908, 1909, 1910–11, 1911–12, 1912–13

References

1891 births
1915 deaths
Italian footballers
Italy international footballers
Association football forwards
F.C. Pro Vercelli 1892 players
U.S. Alessandria Calcio 1912 players
Italian military personnel of World War I
Italian military personnel killed in World War I